Out in the Silence is a 2009 documentary film directed by Joe Wilson and Dean Hamer. It chronicles the chain of events that occur when the severe bullying of a gay teenager draws Wilson and his partner back to the conservative rural community of Oil City, Pennsylvania, where their own same-sex wedding announcement had previously ignited a controversy. The film focuses on the widely varying, emotional reactions of the town's residents including the teenager and his mother, the head of the local chapter of the American Family Association, and an evangelical pastor and his wife.

Community Engagement Campaign
The Out in the Silence Campaign for Fairness and Equality in Rural and Small Town America uses the film as a tool to raise the visibility of lesbian, gay, bisexual and transgender (LGBT) people and promote dialogue and bridge building. The campaign has held over 500 grassroots screenings in town halls, schools, churches, and community centers, many in isolated areas that had not previously experienced any openly LGBT events. The Center for Social Media and the BRITDOC Foundation have highlighted the campaign as an example of using film for social change.

In 2011, the Campaign initiated the Out in the Silence Youth Activism Award to highlight the work of young people on LGBT inclusion and equality.

Awards and recognition

Festival awards and recognition
Premiere, Human Rights Watch International Film Festival, Lincoln Center, NYC 
Winner, Special Jury Prize for Bravery in Storytelling, Nashville Film Festival  
Winner, Special Jury Prize for Social Significance, South Dakota Film Festival 
Winner, Alternative Spirit Award, Rhode Island International Film Festival
Winner, Audience Award, Hardacre Film and Cinema Festival  
Winner, Best Documentary, Rehoboth Beach Independent Film Festival  
Winner, Best Documentary, Long Island Gay and Lesbian Film Festival  
Winner, Best Documentary, Out Takes New Zealand Gay Lesbian Film Festival  
Winner, Rosebud Award, Rosebud Film Festival
Featured presentation, Tribeca Documentary Series

Television broadcast and awards
Broadcast premiere, PBS, 2010 
Encore broadcasts, PBS World, 2010; PBS, 2011 
America Reframed broadcast, PBS World, 2015 
Emmy Award, Outstanding Achievement in Documentary, National Academy of Television Arts and Sciences Mid-Atlantic Chapter

References

External links
 
 

2009 documentary films
2009 LGBT-related films
American documentary films
American LGBT-related films
Documentary films about human rights
Documentary films about same-sex marriage in the United States
Documentary films about violence against LGBT people
Films about bullying
LGBT culture in Pennsylvania
Documentary films about Pennsylvania
2000s English-language films
2000s American films